Natural predictive dialing is a technology that was developed to eliminate problems typically associated with predictive dialing. These issues include abandoned calls, initial call delays, government regular, and consumer dissatisfaction, among others.

A standard predictive dialer will first determine if a live person has answered the phone call, then transfer that call to an agent that is deemed to be available to take the call.  

Conversely, a natural predictive dialer connects the agent prior to the completion of the automation process, which allows the agent to hear the caller while the automation is still working.

At its core, natural predictive dialing technologies are based on the concept that call automation should work with agents, instead of call automation working before agents are connected, and then agents being connected to calls that have been determined to be 'live' people. 

In natural predictive dialing, the call automation [sometimes called Call Progress Analysis (CPA)] can work before, during, or after a caller has interfered with a call.  This interweaving of automation and human agents provides an impressive productivity increase and works to eliminate the unnatural effect that many call automation technologies have on the human interaction aspects of the call.

Benefits 
Proponents of natural predictive dialing claim the core benefit to be a more pleasant human interactions that occur during calls that are actually being made by an automated system connected to agents.  In natural predictive dialing, the agents hear the called party say "hello" and can respond accordingly.  The technology is deployed on small and large scales (one user up to thousands).  Contact centers aiming for a natural calling experience and increased  productivity use this technology.

Drawbacks 
The only commercially available natural predictive dialer is provided by a single vendor.  Additionally, patents protecting the technology make it more expensive than many other systems, such as those available for free based on the Asterisk platform.  Many contact centers and other organizations don't necessarily need the 
benefits associated with the natural predictive dialing technology and can save money by using a more inexpensive or less-proprietary system.

See also

 Predictive dialer
 Dialer
 Auto dialer

References 

Telemarketing
Telephony